Toby Markham is a Grand Prix motorcycle racer from the United Kingdom.

Career statistics

By season

Races by year

External links
 Profile on motogp.com

1988 births
Living people
British motorcycle racers
English motorcycle racers
250cc World Championship riders